En ganske almindelig pige is a 1940 Danish family film directed by Lau Lauritzen Jr. and Alice O'Fredericks.

Cast
Lau Lauritzen Jr. as Filmjournalist Poul Hansen
Ib Schønberg as Kriminalreporter Lassen
Sigrid Horne-Rasmussen as Redaktør Frederikke
Bodil Kjer as Tove Jørgensen
Gerda Neumann as Grete
Clara Østø as Frk. Stjerneborg
Ulrik Neumann as Grete's bror Peter
Helge Kjærulff-Schmidt as Bogholder Thomsen
Gunnar Lauring as Filminstruktør Højer
Jon Iversen as Direktør for 'Bio Film'
Tut Kragh as Skuespillerinde Else Lund
Helga Frier asLassens tante

External links

1940 films
1940s Danish-language films
Danish black-and-white films
Films directed by Lau Lauritzen Jr.
Films directed by Alice O'Fredericks
1940 drama films
Danish drama films